Mike Brizendine is the head men's soccer coach at Virginia Tech. He has held that position since the 2009 season, in which the Hokies posted a 5-12-2 record. He had previously served as the top assistant coach at Virginia Tech from 2004 to 2009. As a member of the staff, Virginia Tech reached the 2007 college cup. He was named NSCAA's Atlantic Region Coach of the Year in 2007 for his efforts. From 2001 to 2003, he coached at Bridgewater College, posting a 23-13 overall mark there. He was named the Old Dominion Athletic Conference coach of the year for his efforts.

He was also an assistant coach at Ferrum College in 1999. He played college soccer at James Madison University from 1995 to 1998.

External links
 VT Coaching Profile
 JMU Athletics Profile

Virginia Tech Hokies men's soccer coaches
James Madison Dukes men's soccer players
Living people
1977 births
People from McLean, Virginia
Sportspeople from Fairfax County, Virginia
Soccer players from Virginia
Association football forwards
American soccer coaches
Association football players not categorized by nationality